Alyth/Bonnybrook/Manchester is a predominantly industrial and subordinately residential neighbourhood in the southeast quadrant of Calgary, Alberta. Alyth is located south of Inglewood, while Manchester lies east of Macleod Trail and south of 34 Avenue S (this section also named Burnsland).

The Alyth Yard of the Canadian Pacific Railway is located in Alyth.

They are represented in the Calgary City Council by the Ward 9 councillor. Manchester has an area redevelopment plan in place, and the population is served by the Windsor Park Community Association.

The postal code in this area is T2G.

Demographics

Residents in this community had a median household income of $35,675 in 2000, and there were 35.8% low income residents living in the neighbourhood. As of 2000, 14.3% of the residents were immigrants. A proportion of 66.7% of the buildings were condominiums or apartments, and 70.4% of the housing was used for renting.

See also
List of neighbourhoods in Calgary

References

Neighbourhoods in Calgary